La Calle, meaning 'the street' in the Spanish language, may refer to:

"La Calle" (song), a song written, produced and performed by Juan Luis Guerra and Juanes
La Calle Stenger, a neighborhood located in San Benito, Texas
El Kala, formerly La Calle, a port in Algeria

People
Andrés García La Calle (1909 - 1980), squadron leader of the 1st fighter squadron of the Spanish Republic and later Commander of all the fighter units of the Spanish Republican Air Force
Antonio Sánchez de la Calle, a Spanish footballer
Humberto De la Calle Lombana, a Colombian lawyer and politician

See also
 
Lacalle
López de Lacalle